Peter D. Keightley FRS is Professor of Evolutionary Genetics at the Institute of Evolutionary Biology in School of Biological Sciences at the University of Edinburgh.

Education
Keightley was educated at the University of Edinburgh where he was awarded a PhD in 1989 for research on genetic variation supervised by William G. Hill. During his doctoral work he collaborated with Henrik Kacser on a highly cited paper on genetic dominance.

Research
Keightley leads a laboratory which works on evolutionary genetics and the evolutionary impact of new mutations on molecular genetic and quantitative trait variation and fitness. His research investigates genetic variation and adaptation through the analysis of nucleotide variation within natural populations and between different species.

Keightley's research has been funded by the Biotechnology and Biological Sciences Research Council (BBSRC).

Awards and honours
Keightley was elected a Fellow of the Royal Society in 2014. His nomination reads:

References

Year of birth missing (living people)
Living people
English geneticists
Fellows of the Royal Society
Academics of the University of Edinburgh
Alumni of the University of Edinburgh